The following is a list of events, births, and deaths in 1929 in Switzerland.

Incumbents
Federal Council:
Giuseppe Motta 
Edmund Schulthess 
Jean-Marie Musy 
Heinrich Häberlin 
Marcel Pilet-Golaz
Robert Haab (President) then Albert Meyer
Karl Scheurer then Rudolf Minger

Tournaments
1928–29 Swiss Serie A
1929 European Figure Skating Championships
1929 UCI Road World Championships took place in Zurich
1929–30 Swiss Serie A

Establishments
Zürich Zoologischer Garten

Events by Month

January
January 9-Jacques-Louis Reverdin, a Swiss surgeon, dies

February

March
March 25-Marcel Mauron, a Swiss footballer, is born

April
April 5-Josef Schraner, a Swiss cyclist, is born
April 7-Paul Sarasin, a Swiss naturalist, dies

May
May 22-André Haefliger, a Swiss mathematician, is born

June
June 20-Marcel Flückiger is born

July
July 27-Geneva Convention (1929), also known as "Convention relative to the Treatment of Prisoners of War, Geneva July 27, 1929", is signed
July 27-Geneva Convention for the Amelioration of the Condition of the Wounded and Sick in Armies in the Field (1929) is signed
July 28-Werner Vetterli, a Swiss modern pentathlete, is born

August
August 29-Fausto Lurati, a Swiss cyclist, is born

September
September 14-John Maria Gatti, a Swiss theatre manager, restaurateur and businessman, dies
September 16-Hans Pfenninger, a Swiss cyclist, is born
September 19-Luigi Taveri, a Swiss ex-motorcycle racer, is born

October
October 11-Liselotte Pulver, a Swiss actress, is born
October 25-Charles Ribordy, a Swiss fencer, is born
October 29-Ida Schöpfer, a former Swiss skier, is born

November

December
December 6-Alain Tanner, a Swiss film director, is born

Other
St. Moritz Ski School is founded by Giovanni Testa, and is the first official ski school in Switzerland
Rudolf Minger is elected member of the government
Marcel Roethlisberger, a Swiss art historian, is born
Meta von Salis, a Swiss feminist, dies
Paolo Vollmeier, a Swiss philatelist, is born

References

 
Years of the 20th century in Switzerland